Tehran Metro Line 3 travels from northeast to southwest. Line 3 is one of the most important lines as it connects southwest Tehran to northeast, crosses busy parts of the capital city, and can help to alleviate traffic problems.

Route
The line starts from northeastern Tehran at Shahrak-e Qa'em going westward parallel to but 300 m north of Artesh Expressway, passing through Aghdasieh neighbourhood. Then it turns south at the end of Artesh Expressway going to Nobonyad Square. At Sabalan square, it then turns west, going under Beheshti Street, intersecting with Line 1 at Shahid Beheshti Station. It then turns towards southwest, passing through Javadiyeh and then going along Cheraghi Expressway and Saidi Expressway. The line then terminates at Azadegan Station at the intersection of Saidi Expressway with Azadegan Expressway.

References 

Tehran Metro